The 2019 Hampton Pirates football team represented Hampton University in the 2019 NCAA Division I FCS football season. They were led by second-year head coach Robert Prunty and played their home games at Armstrong Stadium. They were first-year members of the Big South Conference. They finished the season 5–7, 1–5 in Big South play to finish in a three-way tie for fifth place.

Preseason

Big South poll
In the Big South preseason poll released on July 21, 2019, the Pirates were predicted to finish in sixth place.

Preseason All–Big South team
The Pirates had one player selected to the preseason all-Big South team.

Offense

Gibril Ghee – OL

Headlines
On August 2, 2019, it was announced that former Florida State quarterback Deondre Francois had completed a graduate transfer to Hampton and would be immediately eligible for the upcoming season.

Schedule

Game summaries

Elizabeth City State

Virginia Union

vs. Howard

at Liberty

North Alabama

at Gardner–Webb

at Campbell

Virginia–Lynchburg

Presbyterian

at Charleston Southern

Kennesaw State

at Monmouth

References

Hampton
Hampton Pirates football seasons
Hampton Pirates football